The year 1812 in archaeology involved some significant events.

Explorations
 Swiss explorer Johann Ludwig Burckhardt discovers Petra.

Excavations
 Colosseum, Rome: The arena substructure is partly excavated during 1810-1814.

Publications
 Sir Richard Colt Hoare - The Ancient History of South Wiltshire.

Finds

Awards

Miscellaneous
 American Antiquarian Society is founded in Massachusetts by Isaiah Thomas.

Births

Deaths
 July 14 - Christian Gottlob Heyne, German classicist (b. 1729)
 December 22 - Pierre Henri Larcher, French classicist (b. 1726)

See also
 Roman Forum - excavations.

Archaeology
Archaeology by year
Archaeology
Archaeology